Maria Colombo or María Colombo may refer to:
María Colombo (field hockey) (born 1962), Argentine Olympic athlete
Maria Colombo (mathematician) (born 1989), Italian mathematician
María Colombo de Acevedo, Argentine politician
María Isabel Colombo, Argentine biochemist, 2010 winner of Bernardo Houssay Award
Maria Luisa Colombo (born 1952), Italian singer-songwriter better known as Lu Colombo